The 705 Davis Street Apartments (also known as Seven Hundred Five Davis Street Apartments or simply 705 Davis) is a historic residential building located at 2141 Northwest Davis Street in Portland, Oregon, in the United States. It was designed by Morris H. Whitehouse and J. André Fouilhoux via the firm Whitehouse & Fouilhoux, and was completed in 1913. It quickly became one of Portland's most fashionable addresses due to its fine design and materials and large rooms. Its original owner, Julia Hoffman (1856–1934), was a major figure in the Portland arts community, both as practitioner and advocate. She lived in the building's penthouse until her death.

It has terra cotta exterior details.

The building was added to the National Register of Historic Places on October 10, 1980.

See also
 National Register of Historic Places listings in Northwest Portland, Oregon

Notes

References

External links
 

1913 establishments in Oregon
Residential buildings completed in 1913
Apartment buildings on the National Register of Historic Places in Portland, Oregon
Renaissance Revival architecture in Oregon
1910s architecture in the United States
Portland Historic Landmarks